Jalan Kampung Acheh (Perak state route A177) is a major road in Perak, Malaysia.

List of junctions

Kampung Acheh